Theodore Cohen may refer to:
Theodore Cohen (designer) (fl. 2000), American exhibition designer
Theodore Cohen (chemist) (circa 1930 – 2017, American chemist 
Teddy Charles (born Theodore Charles Cohen, 1928–2012), American jazz musician

See also
Ted Cohen (disambiguation)